The Malcontents were a faction of gentlemen in the Fifth French War of Religion (1574–1576). It opposed the policy of Henry of Valois, duc d'Anjou, who had become king under the name Henry III on 30 May 1574, and allied itself to the Huguenots. The leader was the King's brother Francis, Duke of Alençon (made Duke of Anjou in 1576).

The main goal of the Malcontents was to oppose the absolutist ambitions of the King.
They were unhappy (malcontent) with the way the King treated the old French nobility. 

The Malcontent movement has been compared to the Fronde, 70 years later.

Members 

The Malcontents had both Catholic and Huguenot members.
The leaders were:
 The Duke of Alençon, Catholic and the King's younger brother
 Henri I de Montmorency, Catholic
 Guillaume de Montmorency-Thoré, Catholic
 Henri, Prince of Condé, Protestant
 Henri de Navarre, Protestant and future King Henry IV of France
 John Casimir of the Palatinate-Simmern, German Protestant supporter of the Huguenots in France

Result 
 
The conspiracy was a success. King Henry III of France was forced to sign the Edict of Beaulieu on 6 May 1576, because he needed their support against the Catholic League under Henry I, Duke of Guise.

Political history of the Ancien Régime
French Wars of Religion